Roger John Moat (11 September 1936 – 16 September 2014) was a British poet, and co-founder, with John Fairfax, of the Arvon Foundation in 1968.

Moat died on 16 September 2014 and was survived by his wife Antoinette and their son and daughter.

References

External links 

 
 

1936 births
2014 deaths
British male poets
20th-century British poets
20th-century British male writers